Julie Agoos (born 1956, in Boston) is an American poet.

Life
Julie Agoos is the author of two previous collections of poetry, Above the Land (Yale University Press, 1987) and Calendar Year (The Sheep Meadow Press, 1996).

She received a BA from Harvard University, and an MA from The Writing Seminars of Johns Hopkins University. She was the 1989 poet in residence at The Frost Place in Franconia, NH.

Agoos taught for eight years as a lecturer in the creative writing program at Princeton University. She also taught in the English department and MFA program in poetry at Brooklyn College since 1994. She teaches courses that cover various subjects including Victorian Poetry, modern British & Irish Poetry, as well as special courses designed as tutorial courses in reading and writing.

Her area of expertise is in the dramatic and narrative modes of poetry, and in lyric strategies for the long poem. Agoos is also interested in exploring, in book form, the ways in which poems overlap and infiltrate each other to create a sustained form beyond the forms of individual lyrics.

She lives in Nyack, New York.

Awards and achievements
 Robert Frost Place Residency Fellowship. 1989
 Tow Professorship Award, Brooklyn College. 2008
 Creative Achievement Award, Brooklyn College. 2006
 Towson State University Prize for Literature. 1988
 Yale Series of Younger Poets Award. 1987
 Briggs Literary Fellowship for one year of travel to Florence, Italy. Department of English, Harvard University. 1979
 Grolier Poetry Prize, Grolier Book Shop, Cambridge, Massachusetts (Awards and Honors) 1979
 Lloyd McKim Garrison Poetry Prize, Department of English, Harvard University. 1979

Bibliography

Collections
 
 
List of poems

References

External links
 Language and Space in Julie Agoos Poetics

1956 births
Living people
American women poets
Harvard University alumni
Johns Hopkins University alumni
The New Yorker people
Princeton University faculty
Brooklyn College faculty
American women academics
21st-century American women